The following is a timeline of the history of the city of Yangon, Myanmar.

Prior to 19th century

 6th century CE - Dagon village founded by the Mon people.
 7th century - Town conquered by King Punnarika of Pegu, renamed "Aramana."
1362 - Binnya U raised the height of Shwedagon Pagoda 
1364 - Mon Princess Maha Dewi, a sister of King Binnya U became Governor of Dagon.
 1413 - Town occupied by Burmans.
1415 - Mon Prince Binnya Set became Governor of Dagon.
 1460 - Palace built by Mon Queen Shin Sawbu.
1484 - Great Bell of Dhammazedi presented.
1583 - Italian merchant, Gasparo Balbi visits.
 1755 - Dagon captured by Burman King Alaungpaya and renamed "Yangon."
1756 - Between 1756-59 Alaungpaya appointed Mon Governor of Yangon, Smim Noradecha (Ma Pu) joins Mon rebellion (approximate date).
 1768 - Earthquake.
 1790 - The Mon people (also known as Peguans) in power.
 1790s - British East India Company factory in business (approximate date).

19th century
 1823 
Population: 30,000 (estimate).
Guanyin Gumiao Temple built
1824 - Battle of Rangoon.
 1825 - British in power.
 1827 - British occupation ends per Treaty of Yandabo.
 1841 - King Tharrawaddy in residence; city wall built.
 1850 - Fire.
 1852
 April: Second Anglo-Burmese War begins; British in power.
 City becomes capital of British Burma.
 1853 - Port of Rangoon established.
 1854 - Rangoon Chronicle begins publication.
1855 
A Mon noble named Maung Khaing becomes the first Magistrate of Yangon (Rangoon)
Maung Htaw Lay (former Mon governor of Dala) restores Shwedagon Pagoda 
1857 -  BI Steam Navigation Company starts Calcutta-Rangoon-Moulmein service.
1860 - St. Paul's English High School established.
1861 - Kheng Hock Keong built
1868 - Irrawaddy Flotilla Company starts Rangoon-Mandalay service.
 1872
 Population: 98,745.
 Baptist College opens.
 1874 - 31 July: Municipality constituted.
1875 - Fushan Temple built.
 1876 - City area expanded.
 1877
 Railway begins operating.
 Central Railway Station built.
Long Shan Tang Temple built.
 1878 - Rangoon College established.
 1879 - City "separated from Hathawaddy District."
 1881 - Population: 134,176.
 1882 - Methodist Episcopal Girls School founded.
 1883
 Inya Lake created.
 Twante Canal opens.
 1887 - Dufferin Hospital opens
1888 - Income tax established.
 1891 - Population: 181,210.
 1893 - June: Riot.
 1899
 General Hospital founded.
 Saint Mary's Cathedral built.

20th century

 1901
Strand Hotel opens.
Population: 234,881.
 1902 - Secretariat Building constructed.
 1906 - Victoria Memorial Park and Zoological Gardens opens.
1907 - Chaukhtatgyi Buddha Temple built.
 1911 - High Court building constructed.
 1912 - Gymkhana Ground (cricket) in use.
 1913 - Burma Art Club founded (approximate date).
1914 - Myanma Alin (New Light of Myanmar) newspaper begins.
1915 - Lim Chin Tsong Palace built (approximate date). 
 1920
 Myoma National High School founded.
 Governor's Residence built.
 1921 - City boundaries expanded.
 1922 - City incorporated.
 1926 - Scott's Market built.
 1927
 BOC College of Engineering and Mining established.
 Medical school building constructed.
 1930
 Race riots in Rangoon
 Earthquake kills over 550 people.
 1931 - Population: 398,967.
 1936 - Yangon City Hall built.
 1937 - City becomes capital of Burma.
 1938 - Race riots in Rangoon
 1942 - Japanese occupation begins.
 1943
 Biruma Shinbun newspaper begins publication.
 8 November: Bombing destroys Botataung Pagoda.
 U Wisara Monument erected.
 1945 - Japanese occupation ends.
 1947 - Airport built.
 1948 - 4 January: City becomes capital of the independent Union of Burma.
 1952
 National Museum of the Union of Burma opens.
 Kaba Aye Pagoda built.
 1953 - Population: 711,520.
 1957 - Kyemon newspaper begins publication.
 1958 - The Botataung newspaper begins publication.
 1960 
Population: 1,284,642.
Yangon Children's Hospital opens
1961 
May - South Okkalapa Maternal and Child Hospital opens
December- 2nd South East Asian Games held
 1962
 7 July - Government guns down student protesters.
 Bogyoke Aung San Museum established.
 1963 - Medical College 2 opens
1964 - Institute of Foreign Languages (IFL) opens
1967 - 26 June: "Anti-Chinese riot."
 1968 - Planetarium established.
1969 -  5th South East Asian Games
1972 - Karaweik built
 1973 - Population: 2,055,365 (approximate).
 1974 - Government guns down student protesters following U Thant's death
 1980 - Maha Wizaya Pagoda built.
 1983
 9 October: Bombing at Martyrs' Mausoleum.
 Population: 2,513,023.
 1984 - New Yangon General Hospital opens
1985 - Thuwunna Stadium opens.
 1988
 8 August: 8888 Uprising.
 State Law and Order Restoration Council headquartered in city.
Ko Lay becomes mayor.
 1989 - City renamed "Yangon."
 1990 
Yangon City Development Committee established.
Bayinnaung Market established 
 1991 - National Theatre of Yangon opens.
 1992 - Asia World Group conglomerate headquartered in city.
1993 - Dagon University opens
1994 - Thingangyun Sanpya Hospital opens
 1996 - Myanmar Securities Exchange established.
 1998 - Myanmar Motion Picture Museum established.
1999 - Sakura Tower opens.

21st century
 2001 - Yangon City FM radio begins broadcasting.
2002 - Kyauktawgyi Buddha Temple (Yangon) opens.
October 1: Birth of Steven Wai Yan
 2005 
May: May 2005 Yangon bombings
November: National capital relocated from Yangon to Naypyidaw.
 2007
 September: Anti-government protests led by monks; crackdown.
 Yangon International Airport terminal built.
 2008
 2 May: Cyclone Nargis.
 September: Explosion near City Hall.
 2009 - Yangon United Football Club formed.
 2010
 16 April: April 2010 Yangon Thingyan bombings
 Population: 4,348,000.
 2011 
Hla Myint becomes mayor.
2011 Yangon explosion
 2012 
February: Shwedagon Pagoda Festival resumes.
Yangon Heritage Trust begins 
 2013
 January: Marathon held.
 April: School fire.
 December: Some events of 27th Southeast Asian Games take place.
 2014 - Population: 4,575,155 (2014 census); 5,211,431 (urban agglomeration).
2015 - Yangon Stock Exchange begins
2017 - Yangon Bus Service begins
2020 
27 March: first COVID-19 case in Yangon

See also

 Yangon history
 Yangon City Heritage List
 List of name changes in Yangon
 List of mayors of Yangon
 List of universities and colleges in Yangon
 List of hospitals in Yangon
 List of districts and neighborhoods of Yangon

References

Bibliography

Published in the 19th century
 
 
 
 

Published in the 20th century
 
 
 
 
 
 
 
 
 
 
 
 

Published in the 21st century

External links

 Map of Rangoon, 1912

History of Yangon
Yangon
Years in Myanmar
Yangon-related lists